Bag Enderby is a hamlet in the civil parish of Greetham with Somersby , in the East Lindsey district of Lincolnshire, England.

Bag Enderby is little more than the buildings of Hall Farm, Ferndale Manor (which at one time was the rectory), a few cottages and a church.

The village Grade II* listed Anglican church is dedicated to St Margaret. It was built in 1407 with money bequeathed by Albinus de Enderby, who died in that year, and is commemorated on a sepulchral slab. Brass inscriptions are to Thomas and Agnes Enderby, 1390; and to John Gedney, 1533. In the chancel are effigies of Andrew and Dorothy Gedney and their four children, 1591. The font includes sculptures of Pietà, and David playing the harp. There are also fragments of old glass depicting the arms of Crowland Abbey.

The father of Alfred, Lord Tennyson was minister of the church from 1807 to 1831.

Was once home to 1960s singer Paul Hanford.

See also
Bag End
Mavis Enderby
Wood Enderby
Enderby, Leicestershire

References

External links

St Margaret's Church, Bag Enderby
The Enderbys
"Bag Enderby", Genuki.org.uk. Retrieved 17 April 2012

Villages in Lincolnshire
East Lindsey District